A perfect game is the highest score possible in a game of bowling, achieved by scoring a strike in every frame. In bowling games that use 10 pins, such as ten-pin bowling, candlepin bowling, and duckpin bowling, the highest possible score is 300, achieved by bowling 12 strikes in a row in a traditional single game: one strike in each of the first nine frames, and three more in the tenth frame.

In five-pin bowling, the highest possible score is 450, as a strike is worth 15 pins. It is rare to bowl or witness one. The Canadian Five Pin Bowlers Association approves from 10 to 40 perfect games per year.

300 game

Certification process
First, the bowler and league (or tournament) must be in good standing with the organization. In earlier years, the bowling ball(s) used in the scoring was taken for testing (hardness, weighting, and other aspects that would otherwise break the organization's regulations). Also, the lanes used in the scoring were shut down after the last game of the day was completed. The official then used a tape reader to test the oil condition, to make sure it met the organization's regulations. The data was then sent to the certifying body, and the score received a certification decision a few days to a few weeks later.

There are cases where the tests do not meet regulation, and therefore the score is not recognized by the organization. However, the score still counts towards the league or tournament statistics. Modern recognition is much easier; lanes are no longer shut down, balls are no longer taken and inspected. The lanes are inspected once a year, and the ball's make and serial number (USBC only requires that the ball have an engraved serial number, they do not need the actual number) are taken by a league/tournament official and reported to the certifying organization.

Recognition
In league or tournament play, a certified 300 game is usually commemorated with a ring. Subsequent league 300s are denoted by setting "chips" or precious stones into the ring, so that skilled bowlers do not have to wear several rings. The United States Bowling Congress (USBC) offers a "multiple" 300 ring for an additional fee that features the number of approved 300 games for that bowler surrounded by stones. The ring can be returned to have the number changed as the bowler rolls additional perfect games.

In casual or "open" play, a 300 game is not recognized officially by any certifying, professional, or other organization, but may be honored by other means within the bowling center, such as a plaque, trophy, "wall of fame" photo, or other prize.

Televised 300 games
A handful of 300 games have been broadcast on live TV. This occurred on October 4, 1953, during an Eastern All-Star league session in Newark, New Jersey. (Castellano is a member of the United States Bowling Congress Hall of Fame.) A more recent example came in October 2006, when England's Paul Moor became the first man to register a score of 300 in the Weber Cup (the first 300 on live British television), the annual Europe versus America team challenge event. Australian Jason Belmonte became the first bowler to ever roll a 300 game in the televised finals of the World Tenpin Masters, defeating Moor in the 2007 event. Tommy Jones had shot a perfect game in each Weber Cup from 2007 to 2009. Shota Kawazoe has rolled back-to-back 300 games on live Japanese television.

A bowler that bowls a perfect game on a televised PBA Tour event receives a $10,000 bonus, although the PBA and/or its sponsors have occasionally offered as much as a $1 million bonus for a player that bowls a 300 game in selected televised events. Through June 2022, there have been 34 televised 300 games in title events on the PBA Tour, and two more on the Senior PBA Tour. The first 300 game in a televised PBA event was rolled by Jack Biondolillo in the opening match of the 1967 Firestone Tournament of Champions finals (broadcast by ABC). This was also the first nationally televised broadcast of a perfect game. The most recent perfect games in a U.S. telecast of a PBA Tour event happened in the PBA Tour Finals, on June 5, 2022, on CBS Sports Network, when Kyle Troup (Group A Stepladder Semifinals, second game vs Kris Prather) and Jason Belmonte (PBA Tour Finals, first game vs Dom Barrett) both rolled the 33rd and 34th 300 games on the same day respectively. It was the first time that the accomplishment happened twice in the same day at a televised event.

Sean Rash rolled the PBA's 23rd and 25th 300 games to become the first player with multiple televised perfect games in PBA Tour stops. Canadian François Lavoie, having previously bowled the PBA Tour's 26th televised 300 game, joined Rash when he bowled the Tour's 29th in 2020. Chris Via rolled two 300 games, making him the third member of this exclusive club. (Via is the only player of the three to roll both of his 300 games in the same season.) Mika Koivuniemi narrowly missed (As well as becoming the first to do so) joining this exclusive club. Having rolled the PBA's 17th televised perfect game in 2003, Mika shot a 299 game in the semifinals of the 2011 PBA Tournament of Champions.  Belmonte's 2022 PBA Tour Finals championship match 1 300 game made him the fourth (21st in 2012 and 34th in 2022).

Two other players have shot multiple 300 games on U.S. television, though one or both games were not rolled in an official PBA title event. In 2009, Wes Malott rolled two 300 games in an ESPN broadcast of the King of Bowling series. Though this event featured PBA players, it was not an official PBA Tour event. Ryan Shafer, who earlier in his career rolled the PBA's 19th televised 300 in a PBA Tour event, threw his second televised 300 game in a singles match at the Geico PBA Team Shootout, a made-for-TV event broadcast on ESPN, July 2, 2011. PBA Hall of Famer Chris Barnes, who rolled the PBA's 22nd televised 300 game, has also rolled live perfect games on European television (2014 QubicaAMF World Cup) and Japanese television (2015 PBA-DHC Japan Invitational).

Female bowlers have also achieved perfection in front of a television audience. Ritsuko Nakayama of the Japan Professional Bowling Association became the first female to score a perfect game in front of a national television audience, doing so in Japan on August 21, 1970. Michelle Feldman of the Professional Women's Bowling Association (PWBA) became the first female to score a 300 on American national television, when she accomplished the feat in a 1997 Prime Sports broadcast. Cara Honeychurch, Liz Johnson and Dasha Kovalova have also bowled 300 games in PWBA events on American TV. Urara Himeji, Wendy Macpherson and Takiko Naganawa have rolled 300 games on Japanese national television – all during JPBA events.

The following is a list of all perfect 300 games in nationally televised PBA Tour title events (PBA Hall of Famers marked with an asterisk; major tournaments in bold text):

Andy Varipapa 300
Andy Varipapa, a standout bowler from the 1930s and 1940s, joked about a  being twelve strikes in a row spanning two games. Hence, such a result is named after the veteran bowler.

Back-to-back
75-year-old Will June, grandfather of Cato June, became the oldest player to bowl consecutive perfect games on August 31, 2010.

Perfect series

A 900 series, a three-game set with scores adding up to 900, is a more difficult feat to achieve than bowling a single perfect game because it requires more consistency and careful attention to the subtle changes in the lane conditions from game to game. The first six 900 series reported, starting with PBA Hall of Famer Glenn Allison's in 1982, were all rejected by the USBC for various reasons – mostly due to nonconforming lane conditions. Finally, in 1997, an officially certified 900 series was bowled by collegiate bowler Jeremey Sonnenfeld, rolled at Sun Valley Lanes in Lincoln, Nebraska. It was the first 900 series approved by the USBC. Twelve perfect series were bowled in the ten-year period 1997–2008, and six were bowled in the two years 2009–2010. As of June 25, 2022, the USBC lists a total of 40 officially certified 900 series by 39 different bowlers, with Robert Mushtare the only person to roll more than one.

In fiction
The concept of a perfect bowling game has been regularly used in fiction for either suspenseful or comedic effect.
 In a season 4 episode of Married... with Children, "Peggy Turns 300," Peggy bowls a perfect game immediately after Al breaks the record at their local alley.
 In one episode of Camp Lazlo, Scout Master Lumpus builds his own personal bowling lane and attempts to bowl a perfect game, but as usual, Lazlo and his friends Raj and Clam come along and foil it, in curiosity of what he's doing.
 In one episode of The Flintstones, an invisible Barney helps Fred bowl a "perfect game" by knocking/kicking aside all the pins whenever Fred bowls the ball.
 In the episode "Bowling" of Malcolm in the Middle, Hal almost bowls a perfect game, but Malcolm accidentally gets caught in the pinsetter and is dropped onto the pins on the 12th roll. Although the computer claims that Hal bowled a perfect game (since Malcolm did knock all the pins over), the game is dismissed by the gathered crowd.
 In an episode of Hill Street Blues, the roll call sergeant had bowled a 300 game. After the bowling alley burned down, the sergeant was an arson suspect because his 300 was not league certified.
 In the 1998 movie The Big Lebowski, the character of Jesus Quintana (John Turturro) is seen wearing three perfect game rings.
 In The Simpsons episode "Hello Gutter, Hello Fadder", Homer bowls a perfect game in a parody of The Natural. Later, the baby Maggie also apparently bowls one.
 An episode of The Andy Griffith Show titled "Howard the Bowler" features a bowling match between Mayberry and neighboring Mt. Pilot. Howard is one strike away from a perfect game, only to have the lights go out due to a power overload. He has a day to think about it before he tries for the final strike. They make bets on him bowling a perfect game, and when he returns he gets two practice frames before making his final attempt. Both are gutter balls, so Andy gets the guys to relinquish the bets. With the pressure relieved, Howard makes the final strike for a perfect game.
 In a similar 2001 episode of the series According to Jim, Jim (James Belushi) bowls the first 11 strikes of a game when the power goes out at the bowling center. Jim spends the night, and his wife, Cheryl (Courtney Thorne-Smith), surprises him by bringing Thanksgiving dinner to the bowling center while he waits for the power to return. Cheryl and Jim's family light the lane by placing candles in the gutters, and Jim rolls the final strike to complete the 300 game.
 In the episode "Bowling for Votes" of the series Parks and Recreation, Ron Swanson bowls a perfect game by rolling the ball with two hands from between his legs.
 In the episode "Blind Ambition" of the series Family Guy, where Peter becomes jealous of his friends' achievements, Mort Goldman bowls a perfect game despite rolling the ball so slowly it takes several seconds to reach the pins.
 In an episode "Lawmen" of the series Lethal Weapon, Roger (Damon Wayans) has his photo on the "wall of fame" in a local bowling center for a 300-game (which he admits was only a 290), but was pushed to roll a perfect game to prove it.
 Scoring a 300 game is a common objective in most bowling video games, which often offer unique or rare rewards for the player, as well as a large increase of the player's level.
 In the first episode of the anime Shikimori's Not Just a Cutie, Shikimori, the main female character in the anime and manga series, bowled a perfect 300 in a friendly match against her friends: Kyo Nekozaki, Yui Hachimitsu, Shu Inuzuka, and Izumi, her boyfriend.

See also
 Golden Set in tennis
 Maximum break and century break in snooker
 Nine dart finish in darts
 Perfect game in baseball
 Immaculate inning in baseball
 Golden break in nine-ball pool

References

Ten-pin bowling
Perfect scores in sports